The Molbog-Bonggi languages are a proposed microgroup the Austronesian languages comprising Bonggi and Molbog, 
spoken in Sabah on Borneo, on Palawan in the Philippines, and on the islands in between.

References

Languages of Palawan